Meybod railway station ( – Īstgāh-e Rāh Āhan-e Meybod) is a village and railway station in Bafruiyeh Rural District, in the Central District of Meybod County, Yazd Province, Iran. At the 2006 census, its population was 11, in 4 families.

References 

Populated places in Meybod County
Railway stations in Iran